Archibald S. Currie (February 25, 1853 – May 16, 1930) was an Ontario farmer and political figure. He represented Simcoe West in the Legislative Assembly of Ontario from 1894 to 1898 as a Liberal-Patrons of Industry member.

He was born in Mariposa Township, Victoria County, Canada West on February 25, 1853, the son of Scottish immigrants. In 1857, he moved with his parents to Nottawasaga Township in Simcoe County where they settled on Lot 12, Con 4, just north of Creemore. In 1882, he married Annie Macham and they had three children. When Annie died suddenly in 1886, Currie sold the farm and moved to 3 Nelson Street in Creemore. He carried on an insurance business in Creemore. He served on the township council. He served one term and was defeated by James Stoddart Duff in his bid for reelection in 1898. He died in Creemore on May 16, 1930, and is buried in the Creemore Union Cemetery.

References

External links 
The Canadian parliamentary companion, 1897 JA Gemmill

1853 births
1930 deaths
Ontario Patrons of Industry MPPs